Witty may refer to:

 Witty = Full of wit, clever, amusingly ingenious

 Witty (surname), list of people with the name
 Witty (computer worm)
 Witty (software), a Twitter client
 Witty, Missouri, a community in the United States

See also 
 Whitty, surname
 Wit (disambiguation)
 Wt (web toolkit) open-source widget-centric web framework (C++)